The 2010 Delray Beach International Tennis Championships was a tennis tournament played on outdoor hard courts. The 18th edition of the Delray Beach International Tennis Championships, it was part of the International Series of the 2010 ATP World Tour. It took place at the Delray Beach Tennis Center in Delray Beach, Florida, United States, from February 22 through February 28, 2010. Bob Bryan and Mike Bryan were the defending champions and they won in the final 6–3, 7–6(7–3), against Philipp Marx and Igor Zelenay.

Seeds

Draw

Draws

References

External links
Main Draw

Delray Beach Open
Delray Beach International Tennis Championships - Doubles
2010 Delray Beach International Tennis Championships